David Suzuki Secondary School is an institution located in Brampton, Ontario, Canada. The school is named after Canadian environmental activist David Suzuki In association with the Credit Valley Conservation Authority, the school offers the Ontario curriculum in a program that is rich in environmental studies and models sustainable practices. The school is also distinguished by the high level of computer technology available in school and utilized in classes.

The school draws most of its students from the area bounded by Queen Street West, Hurontario Street, Bovaird Drive West, and Mississauga Road.

Curriculum 
In addition to following the Ontario curriculum, David Suzuki SS also offers a Sports Specialist High Skills Major (SHSM) program (grade 11–12),  French Immersion programs (grade 10–12),  and a variety of environmental programming. Such programs include partnership with the Credit Valley Conservation Authority and environmental education week.

Extracurricular programs 
Students run a Think Recycle program, which recycles old and unused electronic goods. A portion of the proceeds earned go to David Suzuki SS for fundraising purposes.

Campus 
David Suzuki SS has an AstroTurf field and track facility. It also borders on Teramoto park where students can access baseball and cricket facilities. David Suzuki SS was built by Percon Construction. Building began on 1 May 2010 and was completed on 1 September 2011, estimated at a value of $27,910,000.

Social media 
David Suzuki SS maintains an active Twitter account, @DavidSuzukiSS, and an Instagram account aimed at fostering community and digital citizenship, @FacesofSuzuki.

Feeder schools 
 Elementary Schools
 James Potter Public School (K-5)
 Northwood Public School (K-5)
 Glendale Public School (K-5)
 Homestead Public School (K-5)
 Westervelts Corners Public School (K-5)
 Springbrook Public School (K-8)
 McClure Public School (K-8)

 Middle Schools
 Beatty-Fleming Senior Public School (6-8)
 Royal Orchard Middle School (6-8)
 McCrimmon Middle School (6-8)

See also

List of high schools in Ontario

References

External links

 

Peel District School Board
High schools in Brampton
Educational institutions established in 2011
2011 establishments in Ontario